The South Panola School District is a public school district based in Batesville, Mississippi, US.

In addition to Batesville, the district also serves the village of Pope, the town of Courtland, and the Panola County portion of Crowder as well as rural areas in southern Panola County.

Schools
South Panola High School
Batesville Junior High School
Batesville Middle School
Batesville Intermediate School 
Batesville Elementary School
Pope School
South Panola Alternative school

Demographics

2006–07 school year
There were a total of 4,671 students enrolled in the South Panola School District during the 2006–2007 school year. The gender makeup of the district was 49% female and 51% male. The racial makeup of the district was 56.13% African American, 42.71% White, 1.03% Hispanic, and 0.13% Asian. 61.8% of the district's students were eligible to receive free lunch.

Previous school years

Accountability statistics

Athletics
South Panola High School (sometimes referred to as "SP," or "USP," in reference to the nickname of the "University of South Panola," (bestowed by Jackson Clarion-Ledger sports writer Rick Cleveland) is known for its impressive football tradition.

SP (whose mascot is the Tiger) holds the third-longest winning streak in high school football history—89 games, which began in 2003 and ended in 2008 at the hands of the Meridian High School Wildcats in the Mississippi 5A Championship Game. Only two winning streaks are longer in high school football: Independence High School (Charlotte, North Carolina) won 109 consecutive games from 2000–2007 and De La Salle High School in Concord, California won 151 consecutive games from 1992 to 2003.

The Tigers captured five straight MHSAA Class 5A State Championships from 2003–2007, which is the longest streak of MHSAA State Championships since the Association began holding playoffs in 1981. Their streak of seven straight appearances in the 5A Championship game is also a record.

In 2009 the MHSAA added a 6A classification and SP was realigned into that classification.  In the inaugural 6A championship game on December 4, 2009, SP gained yet another title with a 56–14 win over Oak Grove on December 4, 2009 at Mississippi Veterans Memorial Stadium in Jackson, Mississippi. This title was the Tigers' eighth overall, more than any other MHSAA member school.

South Panola Tigers 5A Championship Football Game history:

In 2009, with the expansion of classifications to 6, South Panola moved up to 6A in 2009.

South Panola Tigers 6A Championship Football Game history:

Not surprisingly, South Panola's football program has produced an impressive lineage of college and professional football players. Among the most well-known are former teammates on South Panola's first championship team in 1993 and at the University of Alabama, linebacker Dwayne Rudd, a former member of the NFL's Cleveland Browns and Tampa Bay Buccaneers, and cornerback Deshea Townsend of the NFL's Pittsburgh Steelers. The 1996 and 1997 state runner-up teams featured quarterback Josh Bright, who went on to lead Delta State to the Division II national championship in 2000 and was also honored that same year with the Conerly Trophy which is given to the best college football player in Mississippi.  Peria Jerry, a defensive tackle for Ole Miss, was selected as an All-American by the Associated Press and was later drafted in the first round of the 2009 NFL Draft, selected as the 24th pick by the Atlanta Falcons. Derek Pegues, who was a two-time First Team All-State honoree (by the Jackson Clarion-Ledger) as South Panola's quarterback from 2003–2004, later starred as a defensive back for Mississippi State University of the Southeastern Conference. He was an All-SEC selection in 2007 (Second-Team defense).  Several of Pegues' teammates also competed in the SEC: Demario Bobo (DB Sr., Mississippi State), brothers Peria and John Jerry (DL & OL, Atlanta Falcons & Miami Dolphins, respectively)(DL & OL Jr. & So., respectively, Ole Miss), Jamarca Sanford (Safety – Minnesota Vikings)(DB Jr., Ole Miss), Chris Strong (LB, Fr., Ole Miss) and Jeramie Griffin (RB, Fr., Alabama). Former Ole Miss standouts such as linebacker Eddie Strong and defensive back Toward Sanford also attended South Panola. In the 2019 NFL draft, former South Panola running back, Darrell Henderson, was drafted to the Los Angeles Rams in the 3rd round.

The South Panola High School Varsity Cheerleaders were ranked sixth in the nation in the Super Varsity division at the 2007 UCA Nationals in Orlando, Florida. South Panola Junior High School Cheerleaders were ranked fifth in the nation in the large division at the 2007 UCA Nationals in Orlando, Florida.

More recently, the girl's fastpitch softball team won the 2006–2007 state championship by defeating Oak Grove in a 2/3 set. This marked the first time the South Panola softball team won the state championship.  The Lady Tigers repeated as state fast-pitch softball champions in 2008.  Star pitcher, Whitney Kihnl, was named the state's Miss Softball both years by The Clarion Ledger.

Batesville Junior High's seventh and eighth football teams were undefeated for the 2006–2007 school year.

See also

List of school districts in Mississippi

References

External links
 
 Panola Remembers: A History of Panola Education by Prof. Carl Edwin Lindgren, 1996. Morris Publishing Co. The book is also on-line at Panola Remembers: A History of Panola Education

Education in Panola County, Mississippi
School districts in Mississippi